The 7th Cannes Film Festival was held from 25 March to 9 April 1954. With Jean Cocteau as President of the Jury, the Grand Prix went to the Gate of Hell by Teinosuke Kinugasa. The festival opened with Le Grand Jeu by Robert Siodmak. This was the last festival with a predominantly French jury.

As the festival was becoming more and more a pole of showbiz attraction, scandals and romances of stars were appearing in the press. In 1954, the Simone Silva affair during the Cannes Festival ended up in the destruction of her career as an actor and her premature death, three years later.

Jury
The following people were appointed as the Jury of the 1954 competition:

Feature films
Jean Cocteau (France) Jury President
Jean Aurenche (France)
André Bazin (France)
Luis Buñuel (Spain)
Henri Calef (France)
Guy Desson (France) (MP official)
Philippe Erlanger (France)
Michel Fourre-Cormeray (France)
Jacques-Pierre Frogerais (France) (CNC official)
Jacques Ibert (France)
Georges Lamousse (France) (senate official)
André Lang (France)
Noël-Noël (France)
Georges Raguis (France) (union official)
Short films
Henning Jensen (Denmark)
Albert Lamorisse (France)
Jean Queval (France) (journalist)
Jean Tedesco (France)
Jean Vivie (France) (CST official)

Feature film competition
The following feature films competed for the Grand Prix:

Adventures of the Barber of Seville (Aventuras del barbero de Sevilla) by Ladislao Vajda
All Is Possible in Granada (Todo es posible en Granada) by Carlos Blanco and José Luis Sáenz de Heredia
As Long as You're Near Me (Solange Du da bist) by Harald Braun
Before the Deluge (Avant le déluge) by André Cayatte
Beneath the 12-Mile Reef by Robert D. Webb
The Boy and the Fog (El Niño y la niebla) by Roberto Gavaldón
Bread of Love (Kärlekens bröd) by Arne Mattsson
Chronicle of Poor Lovers (Cronache di poveri amanti) by Carlo Lizzani
Circus Fandango (Cirkus Fandango) by Arne Skouen
Comedians (Cómicos) by Juan Antonio Bardem
Five Boys from Barska Street (Piatka z ulicy Barskiej) by Aleksander Ford
Flesh and the Woman (Le Grand Jeu) by Robert Siodmak
From Here to Eternity by Fred Zinnemann
Gate of Hell by Teinosuke Kinugasa
The Great Adventure (Det Stora Ädventyret) by Arne Sucksdorff
The Great Warrior Skanderbeg (Velikiy voin Albanii Skanderbeg) by Sergei Yutkevich
An Inlet of Muddy Water (Nigorie) by Tadashi Imai
The Kidnappers by Philip Leacock
Kiskrajcár by Márton Keleti
Knave of Hearts by René Clément
Knights of the Round Table by Richard Thorpe
Komedianti by Vladimír Vlcek
The Last Bridge (Die Letzte Brücke) by Helmut Käutner
Little Boy Lost by George Seaton
The Living Desert by Walt Disney and James Algar
Love in a Hot Climate (Sangre y luces) by Georges Rouquier and Ricardo Muñoz Suay
Love Letter (Koibumi) by Kinuyo Tanaka
Maddalena by Augusto Genina
Man of Africa by Cyril Frankel
Marina's Destiny (Sudba Mariny) by Isaak Shmaruk and Viktor Ivchenko
The Martyr of Calvary (El Mártir del Calvario) by Miguel Morayta
Mayurpankh by Kishore Sahu
Memories of a Mexican (Memorias de un Mexicano) by Carmen Toscano
The Monster (El Wahsh) by Salah Abu Seif
Naked Amazon (Feitiço do Amazonas) by Zygmunt Sulistrowski
Neapolitan Carousel (Carosello napoletano) by Ettore Giannini
Pamposh by Ezra Mir
Si mis campos hablaran by José Bohr
Sira` Fi al-Wadi by Youssef Chahine
Song of the Sea (O Canto do Mar) by Alberto Cavalcanti
Stars of the Russian Ballet (Mastera russkogo baleta) by Gerbert Rappaport
Two Acres of Land (Do Bigha Zamin) by Bimal Roy
Windfall in Athens (Kyriakatiko xypnima) by Michael Cacoyannis

Short film competition
The following short films competed for the various short film awards:

 Apollon kai Dafni by Thanassis Meritzis
 Aptenodytes forsteri (Les Pingouins) by Mario Marret
 Aquarium by Ágoston Kollányi
 The Blakes Slept Here by Jacques Bernard Brunius
 Christophe Plantin, imprimeur des humanistes du XVIeme siècle by Gaston Vermaillen
 Der dom zu Koeln by Ulrich Kayser
 El Greco en su obra maestra : El entierro del Conde Orgaz by Juan Serra
 Er is altijd een tockomst by Kees Stip
 Exploratieboren by Bert Haanstra
 Feminine Fashions by Moham Dayaram Bhavnani
 Il fiume della vita by Enrico Castelli Gattinara
 Folk Dances of India by Moham Dayaram Bhavnani
 Det gjelder livet by Titus Vibe Müller
 Una goccia d'acqua by Enzo Trovasilli
 Highlands of Iceland by Magnus Johannsson
 Hokusai by Hiroshi Teshigahara
 Jaktflygare by Helge Sahlin
 Jyske kyst by Søren Melson
 Kék vércsék erdejében by István Homoki-Nagy
 Koziołeczek by Lechosław Marszałek
 Kutna hora by Fr. Lukas
 Land of Enlightment by Mohan Wadhwani
 Den lille pige med svovlstikkerne by Johan Jacobsen
 Lumière by P. Paviot
 Miniatury kodesku behema by Stanisław Lenartowicz
 Le mystère de la Licorne by Arcady, Jean-Claude See
 Nouveaux horizons by Marcel Ichac
 Nytt land under svillene by Per Opsahl
  by Zdenec Miler
 A Drop Too Much (O sklenicku víc) by Bretislav Pojar
 L'Ombre de St Michel by Jean Pichonnier, Paul Pichonnier
 De Opsporing van Aardolie by Bert Haanstra
 The Owl and the Pussy Cat by Brian Borthwick, John Halas
 Pik droujby by I. Goutman
 Plastik im Freien by Adalbert Baltes
 The Pleasure Garden by James Broughton
 Polyot na lunu by Vladimir Brumberg, Zinaida Brumberg
 Promenade au Luxembourg by Philippe Schneider
 Rene Leriche chirurgien de la douleur by René Lucot
 River of Hope by Moham Dayaram Bhavnani
 Ruban noir by Henry Jacques
 El solitario de Sayan by Enrico Gras
 Stare miasto (The Old Town of Warsaw) by Jerzy Bossak
 Stern von Bethlehem by Wilhelm Döderlein
 Toot, Whistle, Plunk and Boom by Ward Kimball, Charles A. Nichols
 Uspavana ljepotica by Rudolf Sremec
 La vie des Chamois by André Bureau, Paul Claudon, P. Dalli, Pierre Levent, André Villard
 Vieren maar by Herman van der Horst
 Viragos kalocsa by Vince Lakatos
 Vita della libellula by Alberto Ancillotto
 Wild Life Sanctuary by D.D. Reucassel

Awards

Official awards
The following films and people received the 1954 awards:
Grand Prix: Gate of Hell by Teinosuke Kinugasa
International Prize
Before the Deluge (Avant le déluge) by André Cayatte
Neapolitan Carousel (Carosello napoletano) by Ettore Giannini
Chronicle of Poor Lovers (Cronache di poveri amanti) by Carlo Lizzani
Two Acres of Land (Do Bigha Zamin) by Bimal Roy
Five Boys from Barska Street (Piatka z ulicy Barskiej) by Aleksander Ford
The Last Bridge (Die Letzte Brücke) by Helmut Käutner
The Living Desert by James Algar
The Great Adventure (Det Stora Ädventyret) by Arne Sucksdorff
The Great Warrior Skanderbeg (Velikiy voin Albanii Skanderbeg) by Sergei Yutkevich
Jury Special Prize: Knave of Hearts by René Clément
Special Award: From Here to Eternity by Fred Zinnemann
Short films
Best Puppet Film: A Drop Too Much (O sklenicku víc) by Břetislav Pojar
Best Poetic Fantasy Film: The Pleasure Garden by James Broughton
Best Film on Reality: Stare miasto (The Old Town of Warzaw) by Jerzy Bossak
Best Film on Nature: Aptenodytes forsteri (Les Pingouins) by Mario Marret
Best Entertainment Film: Toot, Whistle, Plunk and Boom by Ward Kimball, Charles A. Nichols

Independent awards
FIPRESCI Prize
 Before the Deluge (Avant le déluge) by André Cayatte
OCIC Award
 The Last Bridge (Die Letzte Brücke) by Helmut Käutner
Other awards
Special Mention
André Cayatte and Charles Spaak for Before the Deluge (Avant le déluge)
Maria Schell for her acting performance in The Last Bridge (Die Letzte Brücke)
The camera crew of The Living Desert
Aleksander Ford for his direction of Five Boys from Barska Street
Arne Sucksdorff for his direction of The Great Adventure (Det Stora Ädventyret)
Sergei Yutkevich for his direction of The Great Warrior Skanderbeg (Velikiy voin Albanii Skanderbeg)

References

Media
Institut National de l'Audiovisuel: Opening of the 1954 Festival (Michèle Morgan and Robert Mitchum, commentary in French)
INA: Opening of the 1954 Festival (Daniel Gélin and Gina Lollobrigida, commentary in French)

External links 
1954 Cannes Film Festival (web.archive)
Official website Retrospective 1954 
Cannes Film Festival Awards for 1954 at Internet Movie Database

Cannes Film Festival, 1954
Cannes Film Festival, 1954
Cannes Film Festival